České Budějovice is a city in the South Bohemian Region of the Czech Republic. It has about 93,000 inhabitants. It is located in the valley of the Vltava River, at its confluence with the Malše.

České Budějovice is the largest city in the region and its political and commercial capital, the seat of the Roman Catholic Diocese of České Budějovice, of the University of South Bohemia, and of the Academy of Sciences. It is famous for the Budweiser Budvar Brewery. The historic city centre is well preserved and is protected by law as an urban monument reservation.

Administrative parts
České Budějovice is made up of seven city parts named České Budějovice 1–7. České Budějovice 5 forms an exclave of the municipal territory.

Etymology
The name Budějovice is derived from personal Slavic name Budivoj, meaning "the village of the Budivoj's people". The name first appeared as Budoywicz, then it appeared in various similar forms. The German name was created by transcribing and shortening the Czech name. When the royal city was founded in 1265, the name appeared as Budwoyz and then it was adapted to Budweis. The name Budvicium was used in Latin. After the Hussite revolution in the first half of the 15th century, the name České Budějovice ("Bohemian Budějovice") appeared to distinguish it from Moravské Budějovice ("Moravian Budějovice").

Geography

The city lies in the České Budějovice Basin, a small eastern part extends into the Třeboň Basin. The city spread mostly across a plain making it nearly flat in the inner parts with hillier areas in the eastern suburbs.

České Budějovice is situated in the valley of the Vltava River, at its confluence with the Malše. A set of large fish ponds is located in the northwestern part of the municipal territory. Several of the ponds lies within the Vrbenské rybníky nature reserve.

Climate
There are four seasons, with a murky dry winter between early December and early March, a sunny and wetter spring between half of March up to half of May changing to a rainy and warm summer during late May and early September when a dry autumn lasting to late November begins. There are between 1,550 and 1,800 hours of sunshine in most years.

History

The first written mention of Budějovice is from 1251, when it was only a village. The royal city was founded on its site in 1265 by King Ottokar II of Bohemia in 1265. The siting and planning of the city was carried out by the king's knight Hirzo. The German-speaking settlers were coming from the Bohemian Forest and Upper Austria. The royal city was created as a platform of the king's power in South Bohemia and to counterbalance the powerful noble House of Rosenberg, which became extinct in 1611.

In 1341 King John of Bohemia allowed Jewish families to reside within the city walls, and the first synagogue was built in 1380; however several pogroms occurred in the late 15th and early 16th century. Since the Hussite Wars, the city was traditionally a bulwark of the Catholic Church during the long-lasting religious conflicts in the Kingdom of Bohemia. A part of the Habsburg monarchy from 1526, Budejovice remained a loyal supporter of Emperor Ferdinand II in the Thirty Years' War. Budějovice underwent a short occupation by Prussia during the Silesian Wars, and the war between the Habsburgs and the French army in 1742.

In 1762 the Piarists established a gymnasium here and Emperor Joseph II founded the diocese in 1785. In 1847, the production of Koh-i-Noor Hardtmuth pencils was relocated from Vienna to Budějovice.

The city remained a German-speaking enclave until 1880, after which Czechs became the majority. Until the end of World War II, the city contained a significant German minority (about 15.5% in 1930). For example, the ratios between the Germans and the Czechs were in 1880: 11,829 Germans to 11,812 Czechs, in 1890: 11,642 to 16,585, in 1900: 15,400 to 23,400, in 1910: 16,900 to 27,300 and in 1921: 7,415 to 35,800.

During World War II, the city was occupied by Germany. The occupiers operated a Gestapo prison and a forced labour camp in the city. During the final stages of the war, in March 1945, Budějovice's marshalling yard was twice targeted by United States Army Air Forces raids that greatly damaged the city and caused great loss of life. At the end of the war, on 9 May 1945, Soviet troops liberated the city. On the following day, the Red Army and the United States Army met on the main square in a joint celebration of the city's liberation. The entire German population was expelled in 1945 under the Beneš decrees and the Potsdam Agreement.

Demographics

Economy
České Budějovice is the economic centre of the entire South Bohemian Region and the seat of many large corporations. The largest employers with its headquarters in České Budějovice and at least 1,000 employers are:

Beer brewing

Budějovice has long been well known for the beer brewed there since the 13th century. In 1256 the Svitavy brewery was founded there, which was closed in 2002. For a time, the town was the imperial brewery for the Holy Roman Emperor, and Budweiser Bier (i.e. beer from Budweis) became, along with Pilsner from Plzeň, one of the best-known lagers. Brewing remains a major industry. 

The largest brewery, founded in 1895, is "Budweiser Budvar Brewery" which has legal rights to market its beer under the "Budweiser" brand name in much of Europe. The same product is also sold elsewhere under the names "Budvar" and "Czechvar" due to legal disagreements with Anheuser-Busch over the Budweiser brand and Anheuser-Busch sells its beer as "Bud" in most of the European Union. The American lager was originally brewed as an imitation of the famous Bohemian original, but over time has developed its own identity and attained remarkable commercial success. Anheuser-Busch has made offers to buy out the Czech brewing company in order to secure global rights to the name "Budweiser", but the Czech government has refused all such offers, regarding the Czech Budweiser name as a matter of national pride.

The oldest operating and second largest brewery, founded in 1795, was renamed to "Pivovar Samson", replacing its original German name "Budweiser Bürgerbräu" during the communist period. It also exported, mostly under the "Samson" and "Crystal" labels. Recently, they reacquired naming rights for Budweiser for Europe while offering "B. B. Bürgerbräu" in the US since 2005.

Transport

The city can be reached from other locations by inter-city buses and by inter-city and euro-city trains. The city has access to the D3 motorway running from Prague to the Austrian border at Dolní Dvořiště. Internationally, a direct railroads built by the Czech-Austrian companies Emperor Franz Joseph Railway in 1868 and Empress Elisabeth Railway in 1871, connecting Vienna with Plzeň and Prague with Zürich, via Linz and Salzburg, also makes a stop in České Budějovice.

The city is served by České Budějovice railway station, a Neo-Renaissance style station building in the new town. The horse-drawn railway line connecting České Budějovice to Linz was the second oldest public line in continental Europe (after the St.Étienne-Andrézieux line in France), constructed from 1824 to 1832; traces of the line can be seen south of the city.

Local buses and trolleybuses take passengers to most areas of the city. The metropolitan area is served by regional busses and S-Bahn system of regional trains.

Sport

České Budějovice is the site of many sports facilities and national stadiums, including the football Stadion Střelecký ostrov, the ice-hockey Budvar Arena and the Athletic Stadium Sokol. The Swimming Stadium České Budějovice features a 50-metre indoor pool, a diving pool, saunas, an outdoor swimming pool and a children's pool. After the modernization in 1998 a covered water slide was added and after the modernization in 2017 a new whirlpool. Major sport clubs include:
 SK Dynamo České Budějovice (Czech First League)
 Motor České Budějovice (Czech Extraliga)
 Jihostroj České Budějovice (Czech First Volleyball League)
 TJ Sokol České Budějovice (Athletics)
 Hellboys České Budějovice (American football)
 RC České Budějovice (Rugby football)
 TJ Lokomotiva České Budějovice (Handball)
 Budějovické Barakudy (Cricket)
 FBC Štíři České Budějovice (Floorball)
 TJ Dynamo České Budějovice (Football tennis)
 SKVS České Budějovice (Canoe slalom)

Sights

The old town preserves interesting architecture from the Gothic, Renaissance, Baroque, and 19th century periods. This includes buildings around the large Přemysl Otakar II. Square, the old city hall with murals and bronze gargoyles, and the 16th century Black Tower (Černá věž). The most valuable historic building in České Budějovice is the Dominican convent with the Gothic Church of the Presentation of the Blessed Virgin Mary from the 13th century. The Iron Maiden Tower and the Rabenštejn Tower are a 14th-century former prisons and one of the few remainings of the Old Town's Gothic fortifications.

The Museum of South Bohemia dates to 1877 and holds a large collection of historic books, coins, weapons and other articles. It was closed for reconstruction in 2012–2014.

In literature
The city is one of the major settings in the novel The Good Soldier Švejk by Jaroslav Hašek. České Budějovice is the setting and was the working title for the play The Misunderstanding by Albert Camus.

Notable people

Adalbert Gyrowetz (1763–1850), composer
Franz Schuselka (1811–1886), politician
Otto Pilny (1866–1936), painter
Otto Steinhäusl (1879–1940), police officer
Jan Palouš (1888–1971), ice hockey player
Rudolf Tomaschek (1895–1966), experimental physicist
Anna Binder-Urbanová (1912–2004), philosophy lecturer
Norbert Frýd (1913–1976), writer
Rolf Thiele (1918–1994), film director and producer
Haro Senft (1928–2016), film director
Marta Kubišová (born 1942), singer
Vladimír Remek (born 1948), cosmonaut, military pilot and politician
Pavel Tobiáš (born 1955), football player and manager
František Straka (born 1958), football player and manager
Zdeněk Tůma (born 1960), economist
Karel Roden (born 1962), actor
Karel Havlíček (born 1969), politician
Karel Vácha (born 1970), footballer
Jiří Lerch (born 1971), footballer
Jaroslav Modrý (born 1971), ice hockey player
Radek Mynář (born 1974), footballer
Stanislav Neckář (born 1975), ice hockey player
Václav Prospal (born 1975), ice hockey player
Roman Lengyel (born 1978), footballer
Vladimíra Uhlířová (born 1978), tennis player
Josef Melichar (born 1979), ice hockey player
David Lafata (born 1981), footballer
Václav Nedorost (born 1982), ice hockey player
Filip Novák (born 1982), ice hockey player
Jiří Kladrubský (born 1985), footballer
Milan Gulaš (born 1985), ice hockey player
Tomáš Mertl (born 1986), ice hockey player
Martin Hanzal (born 1987), ice hockey player

Twin towns – sister cities

České Budějovice is twinned with:
 Linz, Austria
 Lorient, France
 Nitra, Slovakia
 Passau, Germany
 Suhl, Germany

See also

St. Catherine of Boletice

References

External links

Official tourist portal
Official encyclopedy of České Budějovice 
Virtual Tourist tour of České Budějovice
České Budějovice on DiscoverCzech Travel Agency

 
Cities and towns in the Czech Republic
Populated places in České Budějovice District